Latvian Higher League or Virslīga, known for sponsorship reasons as Optibet Virslīga since 2019, is a professional football league and the top tier of association football in Latvia. Organised by the Latvian Football Federation, the Higher League is contested by 10 clubs.

History and league format

History 
The first all-national Latvian championship, which succeeded the Riga Football League and other regional leagues, was organized in 1927, which lasted until the Soviet occupation of Latvia in 1940. After World War II, between 1945 and 1991 the championship of Soviet Latvia was the main footballing competition in the Latvian SSR.

With Latvia regaining full independence in August 1991, the newly established Latvian Football Federation (LFF) decided to reorganise its competitions within the Virslīga from 1992. The same year Latvia returned to FIFA and became a member of UEFA.

Format 
After the 2007 season the league increased from eight to ten sides. In 2008 each side played the others four times. From 2015 till 2018 there were eight participating clubs. This was increased to nine for the 2019 season and ten for the 2020 season.

At the end of the season, the lowest placed team are automatically relegated into 1. līga, and the winner of the 1. līga automatically takes their place. The second lowest placed team in Virslīga and the second team of 1. līga play two matches for a place in the Virslīga the following season. The winner of Virslīga, the champion of Latvia, plays in the UEFA Champions League qualifying round. The second and third placed clubs play in the UEFA Europa League qualifying games.

A winter off-season league cup, the Virslīga Winter Cup, was played in January of each year from 2013 to 2017, which was replaced in 2018 by the Virslīga Cup.

There again will be 10 teams in 2022 season. Last year participants RFS, Valmiera FC, FK Liepāja, Riga FC, FK Spartaks Jūrmala, BFC Daugavpils and FK Metta will be joined by newcomers FK Auda, FK Tukums 2000/Telms and SK Super Nova.

Sponsorships and name changes 

The League has changed sponsors for several times. From 2005 until 2010 it was known as the LMT Virslīga. No sponsorships were established for the 2011 season. Starting from the 2012 season, the league was reorganised in partnership with an NGO as "Latvijas Futbola virslīga", adopting the NGO's name in the 2012 season. From 2013 to 2015, the league was known as the SMScredit.lv Virslīga due to a contract with the online microfinance company SMScredit. In March 2016, it was announced that the Virslīga would be sponsored by SynotTip Sports Bar on a three-year contract. They were succeeded by betting firm Optibet on a two-year contract, beginning with the 2019 season.

Clubs (2022)

Titles by year
Source:

Riga Football League

 1908 British FC
 1909 RV Union
 1910 RV Union
 1911 Britannia FC
 1912 RV Union

 1913 SV Kaiserwald
 1914 Britannia FC
 1915 Britannia FC

Latvian Championship 1922–1940 (independent)

 1922 Kaiserwald Riga
 1923 Kaiserwald Riga
 1924 RFK Riga
 1925 RFK Riga
 1926 RFK Riga
 1927 Olimpia Liepaja
 1928 Olimpia Liepaja
 1929 Olimpia Liepaja
 1930 RFK Riga

 1931 RFK Riga
 1932 ASK Riga
 1933 Olimpia Liepaja
 1934 RFK Riga
 1935 RFK Riga
 1936 Olimpia Liepaja
 1937 Not Played
 1938 Olimpia Liepaja
 1939 Olimpia Liepaja
 1940 RFK Riga

Football Championship of Latvian SSR 1942–1990

 1942 ASK Riga
 1944 ASK Riga
 1945 Dinamo Riga
 1946 Sarkanais Metalurgs Liepaja
 1947 Sarkanais Metalurgs Liepaja
 1948 SA Riga
 1949 Sarkanais Metalurgs Liepaja
 1950 AVN Riga
 1951 Sarkanais Metalurgs Liepaja
 1952 AVN Riga
 1953 Sarkanais Metalurgs Liepaja
 1954 Sarkanais Metalurgs Liepaja
 1955 Darba reserves
 1956 Sarkanais Metalurgs Liepaja
 1957 Sarkanais Metalurgs Liepaja
 1958 Sarkanais Metalurgs Liepaja
 1959 RER Riga
 1960 SKA Riga
 1961 SKA Riga
 1962 SKA Riga
 1963 SKA Riga
 1964 SKA Riga
 1965 SKA Riga
 1966 ESR-Energija Riga
 1967 ESR-Energija Riga

 1968 Starts Brotseny
 1969 Venta Ventspils
 1970 VEF Riga
 1971 VEF Riga
 1972 Jurnieks Riga
 1973 VEF Riga
 1974 VEF Riga
 1975 VEF Riga
 1976 Energija Riga
 1977 Energija Riga
 1978 Kimiks Daugavpils
 1979 Elektrons Riga
 1980 Kimiks Daugavpils
 1981 Elektrons Riga
 1982 Elektrons Riga
 1983 VEF Riga
 1984 Torpedo Riga
 1985 Alfa Riga
 1986 Torpedo Riga
 1987 Torpedo Riga
 1988 RAF Jelgava
 1989 RAF Jelgava
 1990 Gauja Valmiera

Since independence in 1991

1991 Skonto Riga
1992 Skonto Riga
1993 Skonto Riga
1994 Skonto Riga
1995 Skonto Riga
1996 Skonto Riga
1997 Skonto Riga
1998 Skonto Riga
1999 Skonto Riga
2000 Skonto Riga
2001 Skonto Riga
2002 Skonto Riga
2003 Skonto Riga
2004 Skonto Riga
2005 Liepajas Metalurgs
2006 FK Ventspils

2007 FK Ventspils
2008 FK Ventspils
2009 Liepajas Metalurgs
2010 Skonto Riga
2011 FK Ventspils
2012 Daugava Daugavpils
2013 FK Ventspils
2014 FK Ventspils
2015 FK Liepaja
2016 JPFS/FK Spartaks Jurmala
2017 JPFS/FK Spartaks Jurmala
2018 Riga FC
2019 Riga FC
2020 Riga FC
2021 RFS
2022 Valmiera

Notable managers and players

Most titles
This is a list of clubs, in order of most titles won in championships in independent Latvia (1922–1940 and 1991 to date).
Teams in bold are part of 2020 Virslīga.

By club

Rivalries
The most well-known rivalry is the Kurzeme Derby (Kurzemes derbijs) between Ventspils and Liepāja. The two biggest clubs in Kurzeme have played 86 matches between themselves with a record of 31–28–27 (including Metalurgs) in favor of Liepāja prior to the 2019 Virslīga.

Since 2016, the Riga Derby (Rīgas derbijs) was started between Riga FC and Rīgas FS as two clubs were promoted at the same time. A 2019 match in Skonto Stadium between the two sides broke a ten-year attendance record.

Virslīga clubs in international competitions

UEFA competitions

Ventspils was the Latvian first club who qualified for the group stage of a UEFA club competition, reaching the 2009–10 UEFA Europa League group stage.

Skonto reached the UEFA Champions League last qualifying stage for a number of times in the late 1990s and early 2000s, but lost to such teams like FC Barcelona in 1997, Internazionale FC in 1998 and Chelsea FC in 1999.

Most recently, RFS qualified for the 2022-23 UEFA Europa Conference League group stage, finishing in fourth place with 2 points.

Commonwealth of Independent States Cup
 Skonto
Runners-up (3): 2001, 2003, 2004.
 Ventspils
Runners-up (1): 2007.

Baltic League
 Metalurgs
Champions (1): 2007.
 Ventspils
Champions (1): 2010.
Runners-up (2): 2007, 2011. 
 Skonto
Champions (1): 2011.
Runners-up (1): 2008.

References

External links
 Association Virsliga at futbolavirsliga.tv 
 Current Virsliga table at eurorivals
 Virsliga fixtures, including kick off times, at worldfootball.net

 
1
Latvia
Summer association football leagues

it:Campionato lettone di calcio